The 1996 season of the Conference League, the second tier/division of British speedway. It was listed as the second division of British speedway because during 1995 and 1996 the two divisions of the British League had merged into one division only. The following season it would be a third tier/division competition.

Summary
The Conference League was the first to promoted under the name and was an entirely amateur competition contested by thirteen teams (many were junior sides belonging to their parent clubs). The league expanded from the eight that had begun the previous season's 1995 Academy League - Berwick, Buxton, Devon, Linlithgow, Mildenhall, and Sittingbourne all returned from 1995, and were joined by Arena Essex, Eastbourne, Owlerton, Peterborough, Reading, Ryde, and Swindon. Stoke and Cleveland did not return from 1995.

As not all fixtures were able to be run, the champions were decided by a percentage of total points available. Linlithgow Lightning topped the table to become champions.

Final table

PL = Matches; W = Wins; D = Draws; L = Losses; Pts = Match Points; % = Win Rate

Conference League Knockout Cup
The 1996 Conference League Knockout Cup was the 29th edition of the Knockout Cup for tier two teams.

It was only the tier two competition because the Division 1 & 2 had merged during 1995 & 1996, this meant that the newly formed Conference League was tier two of British speedway at the time. Linlithgow Lightning were the winners of the Cup.

Final

1996 Teams

See also
List of United Kingdom Speedway League Champions
Knockout Cup (speedway)

References

1996 in British motorsport